Rizal Shrine may refer to:

 Rizal Shrine (Calamba) — Laguna, Philippines
 Rizal Shrine (Intramuros) — Manila, Philippines
 Rizal Shrine (Dapitan) — Zamboanga del Norte, Philippines